is an arcade game released by Irem in 1984. It is a platforming game where you climb around pipes to deactivate power switches for the building's main computer while avoiding robots. You can jump on generators found throughout the levels to send out disrupter pulses and kill the robots.

Irem games
Action video games
Arcade video games
Arcade-only video games
1984 video games
Video games developed in Japan